Schwende may refer to:

 Schwende District, Appenzell Innerrhoden, Switzerland
 Schwende, Baden-Württemberg, Germany, a village in Herdwangen-Schönach